Blue flower colour was always associated with something unusual and desired. Blue roses especially were assumed to be a dream that cannot be realised. Blue colour in flower petals is caused by anthocyanins, which are members of flavonoid class metabolites. We can diversify three main classes of anthocyanin pigments: cyaniding type (two hydroxyl groups in the B-ring) responsible for red coloration, pelargonidin type (one hydroxyl group in the B-ring) responsible for orange colour and delphinidin type (three hydroxyl groups in the B-ring) responsible for violet/blue flower and fruits coloration. The main difference in the structure of listed anthocyanins type is the number of hydroxyl groups in the B-ring of the anthocyanin. Nevertheless, in the monomeric state anthocyanins never show blue colour in the weak acidic and neutral pH. The mechanism of blue colour formation are very complicated in most cases, presence of delphinidin type pigments is not sufficient, great role play also the pH and the formation of complexes of anthocyanins with flavones and metal ions.

Mechanisms

Self-association is correlated with the anthocyanin concentration. When concentration is higher we can observe change in the absorbance maximum and increase of colour intensity. Molecules of anthocyanins associate together what results in stronger and darker colour.

Co-pigmentation stabilizes and gives protection to anthocyanins in the complexes. Co-pigments are colourless or have slightly yellow colour. Co-pigments usually are flavonoids (flavones, flavonols, flavanons, flavanols), other polyphenols, alkaloids, amino acids or organic acids. The most efficient co-pigments are flavonols like rutin or quercetin and phenolic acids like sinapic acid or ferulic acid. Association of co-pigment with anthocyanin causes bathochromic effect, shift in absorption maximum to higher wavelength, in result we can observe change of the colour from red to blue. This phenomenon is also called bluing effect. We can diversify two types of co-pigmentation, intermolecular and intramolecular. In the first type co-pigment is bound to anthocyanin by non-covalent bond (hydrogen bond, hydrophobic interaction, ionic interaction). In the second type, we can observe covalent acylation of the glycosyl moiety of anthocyanin. Intramolecular co-pigmentation has stronger effect on the colour. This type of protective stacking is called also a sandwich type stacking and is a very common mechanism in the formation of blue flower colour. Tirantin present in Clitoria ternatea (butterfly pea) and phacelianin present in Phacelia campanularia are examples of pigments with intramolecular co-pigmentation.

Metal complexation: Often blue flower colour is correlated with presence of anthocyanins in the complexes with metals ions. Metalloanthocyanins are composed from anthocyanins, flavones and metal ions in the stochiometric amounts of 6:6:2, respectively. Typical metals in anthocyanin complexes are iron (Fe), Magnesium (Mg), aluminium (Al), copper (Cu), potassium (K) and tin (Sn). Anthocyanins that can form complexes with metal ions are only cyanidin or delphinidin type, because at least two free hydroxyl groups in the B-ring are necessary to be present.

Examples of metalloanthocyanins: Commelinin isolated from Commelina communis contains malonylawobanin (delphinidin type), flavocommelin (as a co-pigment) and magnesium ions in stochiometric ratio 6:6:2.

Protocyanin is a blue pigment of cornflower (Centaurea cyanus). It is composed from succinylcyanin (anthocyanin), malonylflavone (co-pigment), iron and magnesium anions, and two calcium ions to stabilize the complex. Interesting is that the same anthocyanin when is not in complex with the metal ions is present in red rose petals.

Fuzzy metal complex pigments: In the blue coloured flowers, much often instead than metalloanthocyanins we can find non – stoichiometric metal – complex pigments stabilized by co-pigmentation. Those pigments show blue colour only in aqueous solution and are less stable than metalloanthocyanins. Example of this kind of pigment is present in hydrangea sepals. Main anthocyanin here is delphinidin-3-glucoside what should result in the blue flower formation, but cultivars with red and pink flowers are also present. It is known that acidification of soil can cause change of the hydrangea flower colour from red/pink to blue/violet. Explanation of this phenomenon we can find in the molar ratio of co-pigment (acylquninic acid) to anthocyanin, which is much higher in the blue cells, also the level of Al3+ ions is higher in the blue flowers. Additionally, the pH of blue cell is around 4,1 and red is lower around 3,3. This supramolecule is relatively unstable and easily can fall apart in result of change of component concentration or pH conditions, so this can explain why blue colour in hydrangea sepals has low stability.

Vacuolar pH influence on flower colour: pH theory was the first concept, that tried to explain the mystery of blue colour formation in flower petals. First observation showed that cyanine extracted from blue cornflower changes the colour in aqueous solution in different pH. In the acidic range pigment was red but in alkaline solution was blue. It leads to conclusion that increase of pH in cell vacuole should cause increase of blue coloration. This phenomenon we can observe in the morning glory (Ipomoea tricolor) and Japanese blue morning glory (Ipomoea nil) petals. During the flower development we can observe change of the flower colour form purple to blue. Morning glory has just one delphinidin type anthocyanin and the composition of it does not change during the flower development, but change of the colour is caused by increase of pH in vacuole of coloured cells from 6.6 in buds to 7.7 in fully matured flowers. During the early stage of development acidic pH is maintained by proton pumps, on the latter stage K+/H+ exchanger is responsible for vacuole alkalization.

Molecular basis
The anthocyanin biosynthesis pathway is now well known and most of the enzymes are characterised. In the formation of blue pigments a few enzymes have particularly important roles, in particular flavonoid 3'5'-hydroxylase (F3'5'H) and dihydroflavonol 4-reductase (DFR).

The flavonoid 3'5'H-hydroxylase is responsible for the introduction of the second and third hydroxyl group in the B-ring of dihydrokaempferol (DHK) or naringenin which are regarded as the main substrates of the reaction. Product of the reaction with DHK is dihydromyricetin (DHM), precursor for synthesis of all delphinidin type anthocyanin. Enzyme is a member of cytochrome P450 protein family (P450s). It is a very diverse group of heme-containing oxidases, which catalyse NADPH- or NADH-dependent oxidation. F3'5'H was classified into CYP75A subfamily. This enzyme this is regarded as necessary for the blue pigment formation.

Dihydroflavonol 4-reductase is the oxidoreductase that catalyses in the presence of NADPH the stereospecific reduction of the keto group in position 4 of dihydroflavonols producing colourless leucoanthocyanidins as a precursor for anthocyanin formation. Enzyme can show substrate specificity with respect to the B-ring hydroxylation pattern of the dihydroflavonol and can therefore have an influence on the type of formed anthocyanin. For the blue pigment formation, necessary is enzyme, which accept dihydromyricetin (DHM) as a substrate. Product of DFR reaction with DHM in the following steps of the pathway is converted to delphinidin type blue pigments.

Cultivation
In some very economically important flowers like roses, carnations and chrysanthemums despite a lot of efforts was not possible to breed the flowers with blue petals coloration. The lack of F3'5'H enzyme and hence delphinidin type anthocyanin is the reason why blue flower colour was not possible to obtain.

Blue carnations

 
Delphinidin accumulating carnations (Dianthus caryophyllus) were obtained by overexpression of petunia F3'5'H and DFR in the cultivars, without endogenous DFR activity. As a result, a few cultivars with different purple hue of the flowers were generated.

Blue roses

Roses are especially difficult to obtain blue/violet flower colour. Lack of F3'5'H and unfavourable vacuole pH were the main obstacles. A lot of cultivars were screened to choose the proper one for genetic modification. Finally, flowers with violet/blue hues were obtained by overexpression of viola F3'5'H, down regulation of endogenous DFR and in the same time overexpression of iris (Iris x hollandica) DFR. In the result of those modifications flowers accumulate almost exclusively delphinidin type pigments in the petals.

Additionally, hybridizers throughout the history of rose cultivation have made several strides toward producing rose varieties with colors in the lavender, violet, and mauve color families.

These colors were the height of fashion especially in the late 1800s, when the industrial revolution made synthetic color pigments inexpensive and widely available for the first time. Bright shades of royal purple, mauve, and blue naturally became extremely popular and fashionable because these colors previously were only available to extremely wealthy people. The pigments to create these colors were previously very scarce.

Several classes of garden rose were created with magenta and violet flowers during this time period to reflect the growing trend in popularity of these previously luxurious and rare colors.

Notable examples of popular historical roses which are still grown today by rosarians include the gallica rose 'Cardinal de Richelui' ; the hybrid perpetual 'Reine des violettes', and the setigera rambler rose 'Veilchenblau'.

Their violet flower colors are due to complexes of cyanidin with sugar molecules, metal complexes, and tannins naturally present in the flower petals.

In the early 1900s, a new species of rose called Rosa foetida 'bicolor' was introduced into world commerce from the middle east. It has flowers which are bright shades of butter yellow, orange, and velvety blood red, which introduced new genetic traits that serendipitously and coincidentally created a pathway toward new lavender and blue pigments that are independent of delphinidin, a blue pigment not naturally found in roses.

That pathway involves the final stages of flavanoid pigment synthesis which would normally cause flowers to appear yellow or orange. This new species carried small traces of unused genes that allowed production of another type of blue pigment called rosacyanin, which most roses evolved to stop utilizing in favor of producing flower fragrances to attract pollinators.

Rosacyanin allows roses to come in delicate mauve, lavender, and true blue shades.

These colors can be seen in the hybrid tea roses 'Sterling Silver', 'Blue Girl', and 'Blue Moon', among others, which descend from yellow roses. Most notably a popular yellow hybrid tea rose called 'Peace', which was named to commemorate the end of World War II, was used extensively in hybridizing, and fathered most of the original lavender hybrid teas.

In 2004, Japanese company Suntory produced a blue rose, named Applause.

Further hybridizing advancements, scientific study, and possibly further genetic engineering will be necessary to concentrate these natural genetic  factors and cofactors before roses will be able to come in deep shades of true  blue.

See also
 Blue flower
 Pterobilin - a blue pigment of animal origin

References

Further reading

Agronomy
Biological pigments
Biological processes
Botany
Cellular respiration
Plant physiology
Quantum biology